The Régiment de Royal Suédois was a foreign infantry regiment in the Royal French Army during the Ancien Régime. It was created in 1690 from Swedish prisoners taken during the Battle of Fleurus. The regiment eventually acquired the privilege of being called a Royal regiment.

German regiment
The regiment nominally accepted only Swedish officers. However most of the privates and NCOs were of German origin, from Swedish Pomerania, in view of the difficulty of obtaining sufficient numbers of Swedish recruits, and at least one Irishman, Daniel Charles, Count O'Connell, was a Lieutenant-Colonel in the regiment.

The actual Swedish element in the regiment diminished after 1740. Between 1741 and 1749 only one of the 438 men enlisted was actually Swedish. By 1754 even the officer corps numbered only 14 Swedes out of a total of 41. In spite of its origins and connections the Royal-Suedois  came to be ranked as a German regiment.

Count Axel von Fersen purchased the position of colonel-proprietor of the regiment in 1783, according to some in order to be able to stay close to the Queen of France Marie Antoinette. He remained in active command of the regiment until the beginning of the French Revolution in 1789, and officially this was still the case when, in 1791, all non-Swiss foreign regiments of the royal army were disbanded. The regiment was then reorganised as the new 89th Regiment of the Line.

Regimental title
Initially named the Lenck Regiment, the unit was renamed as the Appelgrehn Regiment in 1734. These titles were both names of the successive regimental colonels, following the usual French Army practice of the period. However in 1742 the Swedish government requested that the regiment be given the distinction of being renamed Royal-Suedois.

Colours

Uniforms
From about 1750 onwards the regiment was distinguished by wearing dark blue coats with buff (yellow-brown) collars and cuffs. This colour combination matched the uniform of most infantry regiments in the Swedish Army from the 17th to the early 20th centuries.

Swedish regiment
In December 1813, the regiment was once again raised by a French émigré in Germany, and it fought in the Swedish Army during the Battle of Leipzig in 1813 and during the campaign in Norway in 1814. The Royal Suédois was finally disbanded in December 1814 while in Norway.

Traditions
Today, the regiment's traditions and flag are carried on in the French Army via a company in the 4th Infantry Regiment.

See also
 List of Royal French foreign regiments

References 

Beckman, Margareta. Under fransk fana!: Royal Suédois. Stockholm: Svenskt Militärhistoriskt Bibliotek, 1995. 

Military units and formations established in 1690
Military units and formations disestablished in 1791
Infantry regiments of the Ancien Régime